Vasundhara Doraswamy (born 1949) is the Founder/Director of Vasundhara Performing Arts Centre, Mysore (India). She is a Bharatanatyam dancer, choreographer, and guru. She is also one of the disciples of the late Shri Pattabhi Jois in the discipline of Ashtanga Vinyasa Yoga and has developed her own subdomain in Vasundhara Style.

Early life

Born in Moodabidri, in South Canara (Karnataka) to  P. Nagaraj and Smt.Varada Devi, Vasundhara made her acquaintance with Bharatanatyam at the tender age of 4 under the guidance of Muralidhar Rao and won a gold medal at the age of 5 at the state level competition. which highlighted her potential and prompted her parents to seek out the supervision of Late ShriRajaratnamPillai the student of Pandanallur Meenakshi Sundaram Pillai, who continued in the role of her Guru. Vasundhara, through her dedicated training claimed 1st rank in Vidwath Examination conducted by Karnataka Secondary Education Board and claimed three consecutive gold medals. She was married to Late Sri H.S. Doraswamy and has a son who lives in Australia with her daughter-in-law Meghala Bhat Hirasave continuing in her tradition running Art of Vinyasa school of dance. Meghala is also the secretary for FIMDV (Federation of Indian Music & Dance Victoria) in Melbourne.

Career

In 1988 Vasundhara earned a Ph D for her study on the correlation between Yoga and Bharatanatyam.  She holds a post-graduate degree in Folklore and is a consummate exponent of the martial arts of ‘Tang-ta’ and ‘Kalarippayattu’ that vouches for her quest for multidisciplinary approach to dance e. Dr Vasundhara has released a Treatise on the correlation of Yoga and Dance called "Natya Yoga Darshana".

As for her choreographies, `Panchali` is noted for its singular adaptation of Yakshagana music (a form of folk music from the State of Karnataka) to Bharatanatyam. Solo productions like Ganga Lahari, Ambe, Dakshayani,Panchali, ShakuntaKunjana (literary masterpieces of Udyavara Madhava Acharya) and now Jyothi Shankar's Kshaatra Draupadi –with a strong female oriented theme have won acclaim.

Dr Vasundhara was honoured with "Shantala Natya Sri Award" -The highest State Award for Dance by the Karnataka State Government and the Rajyotsava Award [Karnataka State]. She is the youngest recipient of the "Karnataka Kala Tilak", the prestigious award from the Karnataka Sangeetha Nrithya Academy, to date and also the only recipient of "Aasthaana Nritya Ratna" from Shri Krishna Mutt, Udupi. She has also been honoured with "Chandana Award" by Doordarshan India, "Shreshta Kala Pracharak" from Padma Bushan Saroja Vaidyanathan (New Delhi), " Kala Vipanchi" by Padma Vibushan Shri Balamurali Krishna (Chennai), Natya Jyothi [Australia] and Artist of the Millennium Award [USA], just to name a few. 

An A-Graded Artist in Doordarshan

She is the only Bharatanatyam danseuse to have been invited from India to perform for ‘WORLD PEACE’ conference in Paris under aegis of UNESCO before an audience of 2500 representing 137 countries.

A globe-trotting dancer, Dr Vasundhara regularly performs and conducts workshops in Bharatanatyam and Yoga in different countries. She has conducted summer camps for Bharatiya Vidya Bhavan in the UK. She has travelled to Czech Republic, Poland, France, Germany, United Kingdom and Austria representing the ICCR [Indian Council for Cultural Relations]. Vasundhara's current tours are primarily based in the US, Singapore, Paris and Australia. Vasundhara is a visiting Guest Professor at Alabama University in the US. 
For the past 15+ years she has made Louisville her home every summer and has been conferred with the "Honorary Citizen of Louisville" & "Lifetime Achievement Award" in 2012 by The Mayor of Louisville, USA recognizing her contribution to the Art field of Louisville.

Vasundhara Performing Arts Centre
Vasundhara has established a performing arts centre in Mysore, which has been conducting 4 classic music and dance festivals in Pallavotsava, Natarajotsava, Parangotsava and Chiguru Sange each year for the past 25 years.

Vasundhara Style

Dr Vasundhara gained her initial training in Pandanallur Style of Bharathanatyam. Over the years, with her experience and creativity, she has been able to give it a unique footprint of her own, which has been recognized by the dance fraternity and the art connoisseurs in her performances and that of her students.

As a venerated Guru, Dr Vasundhara has been successful in generating (three generations) disciples who have imbibed her every move, look (Drishti) & nuances needed etc. in the way they perform.

What inspired Dr Vasundhara to experiment with the boundaries of the classical dance of Bharatanatyam was supposed to have been her strong footing in Yoga and experience of martial arts. Her use of singular hastas, alluring gaits, abhinaya which can communicate easily with the common man, modifications of the adavus, aharya, inimitable feather-touch footwork, all within the traditional framework, have led to a unique footprint that is today identified and recognized as "Vasundhara Style".

Book Release
Vasundhara's Biography biography 'Vasundhara: Odyssey of a Dancer' by prof G.S.Paul was released in her 70th Birthday celebrations on 01/11/2019 in Mysore.

References 

1949 births
Living people
Indian female classical dancers
Performers of Indian classical dance
Bharatanatyam exponents
People from Dakshina Kannada district
Women artists from Karnataka
Dancers from Karnataka
20th-century Indian women artists
20th-century Indian dancers
Recipients of the Sangeet Natak Akademi Award